James Baker (born 16 February 1988) is a New Zealand cricketer who plays for Northern Districts and captains the Samoa cricket team. He was the leading wicket-taker in the 2017–18 Plunket Shield season for Northern Districts, with 34 dismissals in ten matches. In June 2018, he was awarded a contract with Northern Districts for the 2018–19 season.

In June 2019, he was selected to represent the Samoa cricket team in the men's tournament at the 2019 Pacific Games. He made his Twenty20 International (T20I) debut for Samoa, against Papua New Guinea, on 8 July 2019. Samoa's 157-run victory against New Caledonia in the tournament's bronze medal match earned Baker a bronze medal.

References

External links
 

1988 births
Living people
New Zealand cricketers
Samoan cricketers
Samoa Twenty20 International cricketers
Northern Districts cricketers
Sportspeople from Tokoroa
Cricketers from Waikato